The Canadian Junior Curling Championships is an annual curling tournament held to determine the best junior-level curling team in Canada. Junior level curlers must be under the age of 21 as of June 30 in the year prior to the tournament.

The event began in 1950 as the National Schoolboys Championship, and all members of a team had to attend the same high school. Efforts to establish the event were led by Ken Watson, Maurice Smith and others. From 1950 to 1957, teams played for the Victor Sifton Trophy. Sifton's newspaper chain was the sponsor of the event during this time. From 1958 to 1975 the event was sponsored by Pepsi and was known as the Pepsi Schoolboys, becoming the Pepsi Juniors in 1976. At that time, the age limit of the event was adjusted to match the eligibility for the World Junior Curling Championships which began in 1975. In 1971 a separate women's event was created, and was initially called the Canadian Girls Curling Championship. In 1980 Pepsi began sponsoring the women's juniors as well. In 1987 the events were combined into one national junior championship and held at the same venue. Pepsi continued to be the event sponsor until 1994. In 1995, the event was added to the Canadian Curling Association's "Season of Champions" programme.

Since 2022 and between 1974 and 1994, the winner of the event went on to represent Canada at the following year's World junior championship. 1996 to 2020 the winner would play in the same year's championship. The winners of the 1994 and 1995 women's events had to play off to represent Canada at the 1995 World Junior Curling Championships. This was not needed for the men, as the 1993 champion Shawn Adams rink was suspended, so the 1994 winners represented Canada at the 1994 World Junior Curling Championships. The 2021 event was cancelled due to the COVID-19 pandemic, and was replaced by the 2021 World Junior Qualification Event played in the Fall, the winner going on to represent Canada at the 2022 World Juniors. 

Sponsors:
1950-1957: Sifton newspapers
1958-1994: Pepsi
1995: Canadian Curling Association
1996-1997: Maple Leaf Foods
1998-2005: Kärcher
2006-2015: M&M Meat Shops
2016: Egg Farmers of Ontario
2017: Ambrosia
2018-current: New Holland

Champions

Men

Women

Notes

References

External links
 Women's champions
 Men's champions
 Records (1950-2005)

 
1950 establishments in Canada
Recurring sporting events established in 1950
Annual sporting events in Canada
Youth sport in Canada
Curling competitions in Canada
National youth sports competitions
Youth curling